The Weaker Sex (French: Le Sexe Faible) is a French comedy play which was first staged in 1929. It mocks the various different schemes of fortune-hunting men to attract wealthy wives.

Adaptation
In 1933 the play was turned into a film of the same title directed by Robert Siodmak. The 1948 British film The Weaker Sex is unconnected to the play.

References

Bibliography
 Forman, Edward. Historical Dictionary of French Theater. Scarecrow Press, 2010.

1929 plays
French plays adapted into films